Butler Black Hare (November 25, 1875 – December 30, 1967) was an American politician who represented the state of South Carolina in the U.S. House of Representatives.

Born to James and Elizabeth Hare (née Black), he was one of nine sons born to the Civil War Confederate veteran. He graduated from Newberry College and earned his law degree from George Washington University.  He served his first term in the U.S. House of Representatives in 1924, representing the 2nd district of South Carolina. He served from 1925 to 1933, and then did not run again after redistricting eliminated a seat from South Carolina's congressional delegation.

He returned to the House in 1939 after defeating incumbent John Taylor. He served from 1939 to 1947 as the representative from the 3rd District. His main accomplishment as a Representative was authoring the Hare–Hawes–Cutting Act, which grants a 10-year Commonwealth status and proposed that the former US Territory of the Philippines become an independent nation. It was later rejected by the Philippine Senate. The Act was later replaced with the Tydings–McDuffie Act in 1934.

His son James Butler Hare, whom he outlived by a year, served a single term from 1949 to 1951 in South Carolina's 3rd district.

References

External links

 
 
Butler Black Hare Papers at South Carolina Political Collections, University of South Carolina

1875 births
1967 deaths
George Washington University Law School alumni
Newberry College alumni
American Lutherans
People from Edgefield County, South Carolina
Democratic Party members of the United States House of Representatives from South Carolina
People from Saluda, South Carolina